Psallus varians is a Palearctic species of  true bug.

References
 

Phylini
Hemiptera of Europe
Insects described in 1841